Hryhoriy Yakhymovych (16 February 1792 – 29 April 1863) was the Metropolitan Archbishop of the Ukrainian Greek Catholic Church, and also a leading figure in the Ukrainian National Revival, from 1860 until his death in 1863.

Life
Hryhoriy Yakhymovych was born on 16 February 1792 in Podborce (today Pidbirtsi), a town in the region of Galicia, a part of the Polish–Lithuanian Commonwealth. He went to school in Lemberg (modern day Lviv in Ukraine), which had since been incorporated into the Austrian Empire, and was ordained on 14 September 1816. During 1818–1819, he served as a parish priest at a Greek Catholic church in Vienna, while he was studying at the Higher Scientific Institute for Diocesan Priests at St. Augustine's. He would go on to earn doctorates in theology, philosophy, and the liberals arts from the institute. He returned to Galicia in 1819, working as the head of the Department of Religion at the newly reopened University of Lemberg. He continued to work at the university for most of his life, and was a professor of pedagogy from 1825, and a professor of theology from 1837. During his tenure, he was appointed as a canon in 1835, and as rector of the Lemberg Theological Seminary in 1837. Yakhymovych was appointed as an auxiliary bishop of the Archeparchy of Lviv by Pope Gregory VI in July 1841. He was consecrated on 21 November of that year by the Metropolitan of Lviv, Mykhaylo Levitsky. He was appointed bishop of the Ruthenian Catholic Eparchy of Premissel, Sambir and Sanok on 5 September 1848, and consecrated on 25 March 1949.

During the revolutions of 1848, Yakhimovich was the leader of the Supreme Ruthenian Council, which supported the Ukrainian National Revival and the pro-Austrian position of the Western Ukrainian clergy, as opposed to the Western Ukrainian Russophiles. He was consecrated as the Metropolitan of Lemberg on 23 March 1860, which made him the primate of the Ukrainian Greek Catholic Church. He also served rector of the University of Lemberg from 1860 to 1861. He suddenly died in Lemberg on 29 April 1863.

Role in the Ukrainian National Revival
Hryhoriy Yakhymovych was one of the leading figures of the Ukrainian National Revival in the mid 19th century. He took part in the Council of Ruthenian Scientists, and advocated for use of the Ukrainian language in schools and in churches. Yakhimovich was appointed as a deputy to the Diet of Galicia and Lodomeria, the parliament of the Kingdom of Galicia and Lodomeria. In this capacity, he defended the rights of the Ukrainian population in Galicia, promoted the Ukrainian language and the preservation of the Ukrainian Cyrillic alphabet, and also the Byzantine Rite of mass. In reward for his service to the Austrian Empire, he was awarded the title of Baron. He was sometimes called the "Spiritual ruler of the Ukrainian state".

Notes

1792 births
1863 deaths
People from Lviv Oblast
People from the Kingdom of Galicia and Lodomeria
Ukrainian politicians before 1991
Members of the Imperial Diet (Austria)
Members of the Diet of Galicia and Lodomeria
Higher Scientific Institute for Diocesan Priests at St. Augustine's alumni
Academic staff of the University of Lviv
University of Lviv rectors
Burials at Lychakiv Cemetery
Bishops in Austria–Hungary
Bishops of Przemyśl
Metropolitans of Galicia (1808-2005)